Mountain Park may refer to:

Places

United States
 Mountain Park, Fulton County, Georgia, a small city
 Mountain Park, Gwinnett County, Georgia, a census-designated place
 Mountain Park (Holyoke, Massachusetts), a defunct amusement park
 Mountain Park, New Mexico
 Mountain Park, North Carolina
 Mountain Park, Oklahoma

Canada
Mountain Park, Alberta, a ghost town in western Alberta

Schools
Mountain Park Elementary, New Jersey, an elementary school in Berkeley Heights, New Jersey
Mountain Park Elementary, Georgia (U.S. State), an elementary school in Roswell, Georgia
Mountain Park Academy a private school in Nakuru, Kenya